The Seafield Children's Hospital was a health facility in Doonfoot Road, Ayr, South Ayrshire, Scotland. It is a Category B listed building.

History 
Seafield House, which was originally commissioned by Sir William Arrol for use as his home, was completed in 1859. In 1888, it was rebuilt with the construction of a lodge by Clarke & Bell in the Italianate style. It was converted into an auxiliary hospital at the start of the First World War. It then became a children's hospital after the war and joined the National Health Service in 1948. After services transferred to the new Ayr Hospital, Seafield Children's Hospital closed in 1991. It was subsequently placed on the Buildings at Risk Register.

References 

Hospitals in South Ayrshire
Children's hospitals in the United Kingdom
Defunct hospitals in Scotland
Hospitals established in 1914
1914 establishments in Scotland
Category B listed buildings in South Ayrshire
Buildings and structures in Ayr